The 2016 Turkmenistan Higher League (Ýokary Liga) season is the 24rd season of Turkmenistan's professional football league. It runs between March and December 2016. Altyn Asyr are the defending champions from the 2015 campaign.

Altyn Asyr were crowned champions for the third time in their history beating Balkan with 23 points. Altyn Asyr also won Turkmenistan Cup, meaning that Balkan received the second AFC Cup-ticket

Teams
A total of 10 teams will contest the league, including 9 sides from the 2015 season and the champion of the Birinji liga, Köpetdag Aşgabat.

League table

External links 
 ÝOKARY LIGA at Soccerway

Turk
Turk
Ýokary Liga seasons